Swim Team may refer to:

 Swim Team (TV series), an Indian television series
 Swim Team (film), a 2016 American documentary film
 Swim Team (album), a 2017 album by Dirty Heads
 Swim Team, an American rock band signed to Infinity Cat Recordings
 Swim Team, an American hip hop group consisting of Open Mike Eagle and others